Suite Antique is a 1979 concertante work by John Rutter that is written for harpsichord, flute and string orchestra.

Rutter composed the piece, in six movements, for a concert at which Bach's fifth Brandenburg concerto was to be performed, and so decided to write the piece for the same ensemble. One of Rutter's most popular orchestral works, it has become an important standard in contemporary flute repertoire and been recorded several times by Rutter and others.

References

External links
 Sheet music (OUP)

Compositions by John Rutter
1979 compositions

Harpsichord concertos
Flute concertos